Juncus maximowiczii is a species of plant in the genus Juncus, native to China, Korea and Japan. It grows in wet areas of mountains.

Characteristics

 Juncus maximowiczii is 5–10 cm tall, perennial.
 The stems are tufted, slender, terete or angled.
 The leaves are filiform, more or less compressed, and the radical leaves are slightly shorter to longer than the stems.
 The flowers are 5–6 mm long, in terminal, solitary heads, and often come 2-3 together, sessile, with ovary. The perianth is linear and obtuse. The 6 stamens are 5–6 mm long, and the filaments are longer than anthers.
 The fruits are capsules of yellowish or light brown color are obovoid, ellipsoid, and longer than perianth. There are 0.5 mm long white tail at both ends of the seeds.

References

 Plants of Taiwan. Juncus triflorus Ohwi 
 Taiwan Biodiversity Information Facility. Juncus triflorus Ohwi, 1937 玉山燈心草
 Catalogue of life in Taiwan. Web electronic publication. version 2009. Juncus triflorus 

maximowiczii
Flora of China
Flora of Eastern Asia